Windsor Road is a major road in Sydney, New South Wales, Australia.

Windsor Road may also refer to:

 Windsor Road, Nova Scotia, Canada; a district of in the Municipality of the District of Chester
 Windsor Road Historic District, Newton, Massachusetts, US
 Windsor Road railway station, Southport, Lancashire, England, UK
 Windsor Road, a portion of County Route 641 (Mercer County, New Jersey), US

See also

 List of roads in Windsor, Ontario, Canada
 New Windsor Road, a portion of Maryland Route 31
 Old Windsor Road, in Sydney, Australia
 Windsor Road cycleway, a cycleway along the road
 Windsor Way (Vancouver), a bike path in British Columbia, Canada
 Windsor Avenue Congregational Church, Main Street, Hartford, Connecticut, USA
 Windsor Mill Road, Baltimore, Maryland, USA
 Windsor Bridge
 Windsor Drive (disambiguation)
 Windsor (disambiguation)